Alwyn Luheni Tera (born 18 January 1997) is a Kenyan professional footballer who plays as a midfielder for Armenian Premier League club Ararat-Armenia.

Club career
On 6 July 2021, Tera signed for Armenian Premier League club Ararat-Armenia.

International career
Tera made his debut for Kenya national football team on 11 November 2021 in a World Cup qualifier against Uganda.

Career statistics

Club

References

External links
 
 

1997 births
Footballers from Nairobi
Living people
Kenyan footballers
Kenya international footballers
Association football midfielders
FC Saburtalo Tbilisi players
FC Ararat-Armenia players
Erovnuli Liga players
Armenian Premier League players
Kenyan expatriate footballers
Expatriate footballers in Georgia (country)
Kenyan expatriate sportspeople in Georgia (country)
Expatriate footballers in Armenia
Kenyan expatriate sportspeople in Armenia